This is a list of notable entertainment and sports figures who have endorsed Joe Biden's campaign for President of the United States in the 2020 U.S. presidential election.

Actors and actresses 

A. D. Miles
Aasif Mandvi
Adam Kantor
Adrienne Warren
Alan Alda
Alec Baldwin
Alex Boniello
Alex Brightman
Alfre Woodard
Ali Ewoldt
Ali Stroker
Alison Brie
Alison Pill
Allison Janney
Ally Maki
Alma Cuervo
Alysia Reiner
Alyssa Milano
Amanda Bearse
America Ferrera
Amy Brenneman
Amy Okuda
Amy Poehler
Andrew Barth Feldman
Andrew Keenan-Bolger
André De Shields
Angela Sarafyan
Anna Chlumsky
Anne Hathaway
Annette Bening
Anson Williams
Anthony Rapp
Armie Hammer
Art Evans
Ashley Park
Ashley Tisdale
Aubrey Plaza
Audra McDonald
Ayesha Curry
Ayodele Casel
Barbara Hershey
Barry Bostwick
Bart Johnson
BD Wong
Beanie Feldstein
Ben Affleck
Ben Harney
Ben Platt
Ben Stiller
Beth Dover
Beth Malone
Betsy Struxness
Bette Midler
Bill Hader
Billie Piper
Billy Crystal
Billy Porter
Blake Lively
Blythe Danner
Brad Pitt
Bradley Whitford
Brandi Chavonne Massey
Brent Spiner
Brian Benben
Brian Stokes Mitchell
Brian Yang
Brooke Shields
Caissie Levy
Candice Bergen
Carol Kane
Carolee Carmello
Carrie Preston
Cary Elwes
Caterina Scorsone
Celia Keenan-Bolger
Chadwick Boseman
Charlize Theron
Chaz Bono
Chita Rivera
Chloe Bennet
Chloë Grace Moretz
Chloë Sevigny
Chris Evans
Chris Lowell
Chris Pine
Chris Rock
Chris Sarandon
Chrissy Teigen
Christine Lahti
Christopher Guest
Christopher Mintz-Plasse
Chuck Cooper
Conrad Ricamora
Courteney Cox
D'Arcy Carden
Damon Lindelof
Daniel Dae Kim
Danny Pudi
Daphne Maxwell Reid
Darius de Haas
Darren Criss
Dave Bautista
Daveed Diggs
David Hyde Pierce
Deborah Joy Winans
Debra Messing
DeLanna Studi
Derrick Baskin
Diane Farr
Dianna Agron
Dominique Jackson
Don Cheadle
Dondré Whitfield
Donna Dixon
Drew Carey (Libertarian)
Dulé Hill
Dustin Hoffman
Dwayne Johnson (Independent)
Ed Asner
Ed Helms
Ed O'Neill
Eden Espinosa
Edie Falco
Edward James Olmos
Edward Norton
Eiza González
Elizabeth Banks
Elizabeth Stanley
Emily Tarver
Emma Myles
Emmy Rossum
Ephraim Sykes
Eric Idle
Eric Roberts
Erika Henningsen
Erin Moriarty
Erin Wilhelmi
Eva Longoria
Evan Evagora
Faran Tahir
Fawzia Mirza
Finn Wolfhard
Fran Drescher
Francis Jue
Fred Armisen
Fred Weller
Garcelle Beauvais
Garrett Clayton
Gates McFadden
George Clooney
George Salazar
George Takei
Gideon Glick
Gillian Jacobs
Glenn Close
Graham Phillips
Halle Berry
Harrison Ford
Harry Shearer
Helen Hunt
Helen Mirren
Henry Winkler
Hill Harper
Hudson Yang
Idina Menzel
Iqbal Theba
Isa Briones
Ivory Aquino
Jada Pinkett Smith
Jaime Camil
James Harkness
James Monroe Iglehart
Jamie Lee Curtis
Jane Fonda
Jane Lynch
Janel Moloney
Janina Gavankar
Jason Alexander
Jason George
Jason Schwartzman
Jason Tam
Javier Muñoz
Jayne Houdyshell
Jeannie Gaffigan
Jeff Daniels
Jeff Goldblum
Jeffrey Wright
Jennifer Aniston
Jennifer Garner
Jennifer Lawrence
Jennifer Lopez
Jennifer Mudge
Jenny Mollen
Jeri Ryan
Jesse Tyler Ferguson
Jessica Biel
Jessica Chastain
Jim Carrey
Jim O'Heir
Jim Rash
Jimmi Simpson
Jimmy Smits
Jin Ha
Joe Lo Truglio
Joel Grey
Joel McHale
John Cho
John Leguizamo
John Slattery
John Stamos
Jon Cryer
Jonah Hill
Jonathan Del Arco
Jonathan Frakes
Jose Llana
Joseph Morgan
Josh Gad
Judith Light
Judy Greer
Judy Kuhn
Julia Louis-Dreyfus
Julianne Moore
KaDee Strickland
Kaitlin Olson
Kal Penn
Kalani Queypo
Karen Olivo
Karen Ziemba
Kate Hudson
Kate Mulgrew
Kate Rockwell
Kate Walsh
Kathryn Allison
Kathryn Grody
Kathy Bates
Katie Holmes
Keala Settle
Keith Carradine
Keith Powell
Keke Palmer
Kelly Ripa
Ken Marino
Kerry Washington
Kevin Bacon
Kevin Costner
King Bach
Kristen Bell
Kristen Schaal
Kristin Chenoweth
Krystal Joy Brown
Kyra Sedgwick
LaChanze
Lake Bell
Lana Parrilla
LaTanya Richardson Jackson
Laura Bell Bundy
Laura Benanti
Lauren Ridloff
Lauren Tom
Laurie Metcalf
Lena Dunham
Leonardo DiCaprio
Leonardo Nam
Lesli Margherita
Leslie Odom Jr.
Leslie Uggams
LeVar Burton
Lily Tomlin
Lin-Manuel Miranda
Lisa Rinna
Liza Koshy
Lois Smith
Lou Diamond Phillips
Louis Gossett Jr.
Lucy Liu
Lynda Carter*
Lynn Whitfield
Madhur Jaffrey
Maggie Cassella
Mandy Patinkin
Manoel Felciano
Marguerite Moreau
Marina Sirtis
Marion Ross
Marisa Tomei
Marisha Wallace
Mariska Hargitay
Marissa Jaret Winokur
Mark Dacascos
Mark Duplass
Mark Hamill
Mark Ruffalo
Marlon Wayans
Martha MacIsaac
Mary McCormack
Mary Steenburgen
Matt Adler
Matt Doyle
Maulik Pancholy
Maya Rudolph
Mayim Bialik
Maysoon Zayid
Meagan Good
Melissa Fitzgerald
Meredith Baxter
Mia Farrow
Michael B. Jordan
Michael Cera
Michael Douglas
Michael Emerson
Michael Ian Black
Michael Keaton
Michael McElroy
Michael McKean
Michael Potts
Michaela Watkins
Michelle Hurd
Michelle Pfeiffer
Mickey Rourke
Milo Ventimiglia
Mindy Kaling
Molly Shannon
Nathan Lane
Neil Casey
Nell Campbell
Nick Offerman
Nick Robinson
Nicole Maines
Nicolette Robinson
Nik Dodani
Nikki M. James
Octavia Spencer
Okieriete Onaodowan
Parvesh Cheena
Patrick Stewart
Patti LuPone
Patti Murin
Paul Adelstein
Paul Rudd
Pauley Perrette
Peppermint
Peri Gilpin
Phillipa Soo
Poorna Jagannathan
Priyanka Chopra
Ptolemy Slocum
Quentin Earl Darrington
Rachel Bloom
Rachel Dratch
Rachel Zegler
Rain Valdez
Ravi Patel
Raúl Esparza
Reese Witherspoon
Rene Russo
Renée Elise Goldsberry
Richard Schiff
Rita Moreno
Rita Wilson
Rizwan Manji
Rob McClure
Rob Reiner
Robert Capron
Robert De Niro
Robert Downey Jr.
Robert Redford
Robin Wright
Robyn Lively
Roosevelt Credit
Rory O'Malley
Rosalyn Coleman Williams
Rosario Dawson
Rosie Perez
Rumer Willis
Ryan Jamaal Swain
Ryan Reynolds
Ryann Redmond
Sacha Baron Cohen
Sakina Jaffrey
Sally Field
Sam Elliott
Sam Richardson
Sam Waterston
Samuel L. Jackson
Sandra Bernhard
Santiago Cabrera
Saoirse Ronan
Sarah Jessica Parker
Sarah Paulson
Sarah Rafferty
Saycon Sengbloh
Scarlett Johansson
Sean Astin
Sean Maguire
Sean Patrick Thomas
Sebastian Roché
Selenis Leyva
Sendhil Ramamurthy
Seth MacFarlane
Seth Rogen
Shangela Laquifa Wadley
Shannon Elizabeth
Sharon Stone
Shaun Ross
Sheetal Sheth
Shia LaBeouf
Shona Tucker
Shoshana Bean
Sonequa Martin-Green
Sophia Anne Caruso
Sophia Bush
Stephanie Beatriz
Stephen Bogardus
Stephen Geoffreys
Sterling K. Brown
Steve Buscemi
Steven Boyer
Steven Pasquale
Storm Reid
Susan Sarandon
Tala Ashe
Tamlyn Tomita
Taraji P. Henson
Taylor Mac
Ted Danson
Telly Leung
Terrence J
Tessa Thompson
Tia Carrere
Tiffany Haddish
Tim Curry
Tina Fey
Tituss Burgess
Tom Hanks
Tommy Chong
Tony Goldwyn
Tony Hale
Tracee Ellis Ross
Uzo Aduba
Val Kilmer
Victoria Clark
Viggo Mortensen
Vivica A. Fox
Wallace Shawn
Wil Wheaton
Will Smith
Willam Belli
William Ragsdale
Wilmer Valderrama
Wilson Cruz
Yara Shahidi
Yeardley Smith
Yvette Nicole Brown
Zachary Quinto
Zak Orth
Zendaya
Zoe Saldana
Zoey Deutch
Zooey Deschanel
Zoë Kravitz

Authors and poets 

Alexander Stille
Barbara Ehrenreich
Benjamin L. Corey
Bobby LeFebre
Brian McLaren
Chelsea Clinton
David Gushee
Diana Butler Bass
Emma Marris
George R. R. Martin
Glennon Doyle
Hannah Friedman
Hemant Mehta
Isabel Allende
Jeff Yang
Jenny Han
Jeph Jacques
John Green
John Hodgman
John Pavlovitz
John Scalzi
Karenna Gore
Katherine Schwarzenegger-Pratt
Kevin Kwan
Laura Day
Marianne Williamson
Marie Lee
Mark Siegel
Nadia Bolz-Weber
Padma Lakshmi
Richard Blanco
Richard Foster
Robert Mailer Anderson
Sally Hogshead
Stephen King
Thomas Abt
Trav S.D.
Vivek Tiwary

Comedians 

Al Madrigal
Alex Edelman
Amy Hill
Amy Schumer
Aparna Nancherla
Bill Maher
Billy Eichner
Chelsea Handler
Chris Redd
Christopher Titus
Colin Jost
Conan O'Brien
Cristela Alonzo
Daniel Rosen
David Steinberg
David Wain
Eric Andre
George Lopez
Guillermo Rodriguez
H. Jon Benjamin
Hasan Minhaj
Helen Hong
Ilana Glazer
Janeane Garofalo
Jay Leno
Jeff Garlin
Jim Gaffigan
Jimmy Kimmel
John Oliver
Jon Stewart
Judy Gold
Kathy Griffin
Keegan-Michael Key
Ken Jeong (previously endorsed Andrew Yang)
Kumail Nanjiani
Larry David
Larry Wilmore
Lilly Singh
Margaret Cho
Maz Jobrani
Michael Showalter
Mindy Kaling
Pete Davidson
Phoebe Robinson
Randy Rainbow
Retta
Rosie O'Donnell
Samantha Bee
Sarah Cooper
Sarah Silverman
Seth Meyers
Stephen Colbert
The Try Guys
Wanda Sykes
Whoopi Goldberg

Film directors, producers, playwrights and screenwriters 

Aaron Sorkin
Abigail Disney
Andres Useche
Andrew Bernstein
Annabel Park
Arvind Ethan David
Aurin Squire
Ava DuVernay
Bartlett Sher
Bill Kurtis
Brad Falchuk
Brad Jenkins
Bruce Cohen
Caroline Giuliani
Chad Beguelin
Chuck Lorre
Cody Lassen
Craig Anderson
Craig Zisk
Daniel Pritzker
David Henry Hwang
David Mandel
David Yazbek
Dean Devlin
Debora Cahn
DeVon Franklin
Douglas McGrath
Dustin Lance Black
Edward Einhorn
Evan Goldberg
Greg Berlanti
Greg Mottola
Heidi Schreck
J. J. Abrams
Jamie Patricof
Jenna Ushkowitz
John Ridley
John Waters
Jonathan Stark
Jordan Peele
Josh Singer
José Rivera
Judd Apatow
Ken Burns
Kenny Leon
Lauren Shuler Donner
Lawrence Bender
Lee Daniels
Liesl Tommy
Lowell Ganz
Luis Salgado
Lynn Nottage
Marta Kauffman
Matthew Lopez
Mel Brooks
Michael Kang
Michael Moore
Michael Patrick King
Michael Schur
Nicole Ehrlich
Norman Lear
Oliver Stone
Patty Jenkins
Paula Vogel
Paula Wagner
Pearl Cleage
PJ Raval
Randi Singer
Rathna Kumar
Rebecca Taichman
Richard Sakai
Rob Reiner
Robert O'Hara
Rod Lurie
Ron Howard
Anthony & Joe Russo
Ryan Murphy
Sahr Ngaujah
Scott Stuber
Shonda Rhimes
Sidney Kimmel
Spike Lee
Steven Spielberg
Theresa Rebeck
Tom Kirdahy
Tony Kushner
Tyler Perry

Media personalities 

Alyssa Edwards, choreographer, drag queen
Amy Watson, ballet dancer
Andy Cohen, radio and television talk show host, producer, and writer
Antoni Porowski, co-host of Queer Eye and reality television personality.
Ashley Bouder, ballet dancer
Ballet Folklórico de México, Mexican folk ensemble
Becca Kufrin, publicist, winner of season 22 on The Bachelor
Bethany Mota, video blogger
Bobby Berk, co-host of Queer Eye and reality television personality
Brita Filter, drag queen
Charlamagne tha God, radio presenter, television personality, and author
Christopher Gattelli, choreographer, performer, theatre director
Colleen Ballinger, YouTuber
Dale Mercer, socialite, interior designer
Dan Carlin, podcaster (Independent)
Daphne Rubin-Vega, Panamanian-American dancer, singer-songwriter, actress
David Letterman, television show host
Steven Kenneth Bonnell (more commonly known as Destiny), American political Twitch streamer/YouTuber
Elle Walker, vlogger and YouTuber
Eva Gutowski, YouTube personality
Frankie Grande, dancer
Geena Rocero, supermodel, TED speaker
Greg Miller, internet personality, former editor of IGN and founder of Kinda Funny.
Ethan Klein, YouTuber and podcaster
Hailey Bieber, model and television personality
Howard Stern, radio and television personality, host of The Howard Stern Show
Ian Kochinski (more commonly known as Vaush), American political YouTuber
Jaida Essence Hall, drag queen
James Charles, YouTuber and makeup artist
Jerry Springer, television show host
Jonathan Scott, co-star of Property Brothers
Jonathan Van Ness, co-host of Queer Eye and reality television personality.
Karamo Brown, co-host of Queer Eye and reality television personality
Karlie Kloss, fashion model
Kylie Jenner, socialite, model
La La Anthony, writer, stars of La La's Full Court Wedding and La La's Full Court Life
Lady Bunny, drag queen (previously endorsed Sanders)
Laganja Estranja, choreographer, drag queen
Lorin Latarro, choreographer
Margaret Hoover, conservative political commentator, political strategist, author, great-granddaughter of Herbert Hoover (Republican)
Meghan McCain, daughter of former Arizona Senator and 2008 Republican presidential nominee John McCain, co-host of The View (Republican)
Montel Williams, former television host, motivational speaker
Nikita Dragun, YouTuber, makeup artist, and model
Nina Davuluri, reality television host
Oprah Winfrey, talk show host, television producer, actress, author, and philanthropist
Padma Lakshmi,  author, activist, model, and television host
Penn Jillette, magician, member of Penn & Teller
Phil Yu, Korean-American blogger
Reza Aslan, scholar of religious studies, writer, and television host
S. E. Cupp, television host, conservative political commentator (Republican) 
Sarah-Elizabeth Langford, former beauty pageant titleholder
Star Jones, former co-host of The View (1997–2006), lawyer
Sunny Hostin, co-host of The View and former legal analyst of American Morning (2007–2011)
Tan France, co-host of Queer Eye and reality television personality.
Tana Mongeau, Internet personality, musician, model
Tinsley Mortimer, socialite 
Trixie Mattel, drag queen
Tyra Banks, talk show host, model, producer

Chefs and restaurateurs 
Anita Lo
Carrie Nahabedian
Cat Cora
Duff Goldman
Elizabeth Falkner
Ina Garten
Martin Yan
Michael Solomonov
Ming Tsai
Nina Compton
Rachael Ray
Tom Colicchio

Designers 
Carol Lim
Clare Vivier
Eileen Fisher
Gabriela Hearst
Humberto Leon
Jason Wu
Joseph Altuzarra
Monique Péan
Phillip Lim
Prabal Gurung
Thakoon Panichgul
Thom Browne
Tory Burch
Vera Wang

Photographers, painters, and architects 

Alexis Rockman
Alice Neel's Estate
Alison Saar
Alvin Baltrop's Estate
Amy Sillman
An-My Lê
Andrea Zittel
Angel Otero
Ayana V. Jackson
Betye Saar
Brice Marden
Carmen Herrera
Carol Bove
Carrie Weems
Carroll Dunham
Catherine Opie
Cecily Brown
Charles Gaines
Charline von Heyl
Chloe Wise
Christina Quarles
Christine Kim
Christopher Wool
Cindy Sherman
Deborah Kass
Dike Blair
Doron Langberg
Doug Aitken
Edward Ruscha
Edwina Sandys
Ellsworth Kelly's estate
Emmanuel Lubezki
Eric Shanower
Fanny Sanín
Fred Sandback's Estate
Fred Tomaselli
Gary Simmons
George Condo
Isca Greenfield-Sanders
Ivan Morley
Jack Pierson
James Welling
Jeff Koons
Jenny Holzer
Joanne Greenbaum
Jon Kessler
Jordan Nassar
Julie Mehretu
Kaws
Kehinde Wiley
Kenny Scharf
Lari Pittman
Laurie Simmons
Lawrence Weiner
Leo Villareal
Lisa Yuskavage
Liz Larner
Lynn Leeson
Marcel Dzama
Marilyn Minter
Martin Puryear
Maya Lin
McArthur Binion
Michael Heizer
Mika Tajima
Pat Steir
Patricia Cronin
Rafa Esparza
Rashid Johnson
Rebecca Morris
Richard Aldrich
Richard Serra
Rob Wynne
Robert Longo
Rochelle Feinstein
Ron English
Roy Lichtenstein's Estate
Sam Gilliam
Sarah Crowner
Sarah Sze
Sebastian Blanck
Shepard Fairey
Shirin Neshat
Spencer Finch
Suzan Frecon
Tara Donovan
Tavares Strachan
Theresa Secord
Toba Khedoori
Trenton Hancock
Ugo Rondinone
Vik Muniz
Wangechi Mutu
William Eggleston
Xaviera Simmons

Musicians

Bands, duos, and musical groups 

All Time Low
Aly & AJ
Andy Suzuki & The Method
Bailen
Beastie Boys
Best Coast
Black Eyed Peas
Black Rebel Motorcycle Club
Bon Iver
Bon Jovi
Bright Eyes
The Chambers Brothers
Cherish the Ladies
The Chicks
The Chieftains
Chloe x Halle
Chromeo
The Clark Sisters
Cozad Singers
Dashboard Confessional
Dawes
De La Soul
Dispatch
The Dixie Cups
The Dresden Dolls
Drive-By Truckers
Foo Fighters
Four Tops
Gangstagrass
The Ghost of Paul Revere
Harlem Gospel Choir
The Head and the Heart
Hippo Campus
The Impressions
Lawrence
Los Lobos
Lou and Peter Berryman
Low Cut Connie
MisterWives
Moon Taxi
Mt. Joy
My Morning Jacket
Nine Inch Nails
The O'Jays
OK Go
Overcoats
Pearl Jam
Portugal. The Man
The Postal Service
Ranky Tanky
Silversun Pickups
Social House
Sounds of Blackness
Spinal Tap (Fictional)
Sylvan Esso
Tegan and Sara
Tenacious D
Trampled by Turtles
Tune-Yards
The War and Treaty
Wye Oak
X Ambassadors
Young the Giant

DJs and instrumentalists 

Melissa Aldana
Steve Aoki
Andrew Bird
Beverly Bond
Hannah Bronfman
Joe Butler
Ravi Coltrane
Robert Cray
Diplo
DJ Carnage
DJ Cassidy
DJ Rekha
D-Nice
Béla Fleck
James Galway
Kiran Gandhi
Aaron Goldberg
Herbie Hancock
Edward W. Hardy
Eric Harland
Fred Hersch
Ross Holmes
Sean Jones
Joe Lovano
Yo-Yo Ma
Joanie Madden
Christian McBride
Mike McCready
Anthony McGill
Mustard
John Patitucci
Itzhak Perlman
S. Carey
Dave Schools
John Scofield
Alex Skolnick
G. E. Smith
Joe Walsh
Jeff "Tain" Watts
Brandee Younger
Miguel Zenón

Rappers 

2 Chainz (previously endorsed Kanye West)
50 Cent (previously endorsed Trump)
Iggy Azalea
Cardi B
Big Sean
Kurtis Blow
Common
Cordae
Chuck D
Dessa
Diddy
Snoop Dogg
Jermaine Dupri
A$AP Ferg
Lupe Fiasco
Doug E. Fresh
MC Hammer
Jeezy
Mike Jones
Kid Cudi
Talib Kweli
Lil Dicky
Lil Jon
Lil' Kim
Ludacris
Pharoahe Monch
Offset
Papoose
Pusha T
Supaman
Taboo
T.I.
will.i.am

Vocalists, singers, and songwriters 

Arianna Afsar
Amerie
Marc Anthony
Fiona Apple
Billie Joe Armstrong
Johntá Austin
Sebastian Bach
Burt Bacharach
Sara Bareilles
Lance Bass
Jon Bauman
Robert Levon Been
Madison Beer
LeRoy Bell
Eric Benét
Matt Berninger
Frankie Beverly
Beyoncé
Michael Bivins
Aloe Blacc
Harolyn Blackwell
Mary J. Blige
Jon Bon Jovi
Gary U.S. Bonds
Leon Bridges
Dee Dee Bridgewater
Dolores "LaLa" Brooks
Jimmy Buffett
Eric Burdon
Camila Cabello
Erica Campbell
Mariah Carey
Fred Cash
Gene Chandler
Kalen Chase
Cher
Ciara
George Clinton
Johnny Contardo
David Crosby
Sheryl Crow
Maranda Curtis
Miley Cyrus
Andra Day
Daya
Raheem DeVaughn
Lila Downs
Huey Dunbar
Steve Earle
Billie Eilish
Melissa Etheridge
Perry Farrell
Alejandro Fernández
Renée Fleming
Ben Folds
Luis Fonsi
Peter Frampton
Lady Gaga
Ben Gibbard
Sam Gooden
Ariana Grande
Ellen Greene
Dave Grohl
Tracii Guns
Lzzy Hale
Halsey
Anthony Hamilton
Glen Hansard
Carlie Hanson
Don Henley
Faith Hill
Jazzmeia Horn
Israel Houghton
Tyler Hubbard
Jennifer Hudson
Jason Isbell
Jim James
Zola Jesus
JoJo
Nick Jonas
Dolores "Dee Dee" Kenniebrew
Kesha
Alicia Keys
Carole King
Damian Kulash
Adam Lambert
Cyndi Lauper
Tamika Lawrence
Amos Lee
John Legend
Dua Lipa
Lissie
Lizzo
Lisa Loeb
Demi Lovato
Madonna
MAJOR
David Mallett
Tamela Mann
Peggy March
Ricky Martin
Vicci Martinez
Dave Matthews
Tim McGraw
Colin Meloy
Shawn Mendes
VaShawn Mitchell
Matt Molloy
Mick Moloney
Monica
Janelle Monáe
Maren Morris
Mandy Moore
Jason Mraz
William Murphy
Kacey Musgraves
Kim Nalley
Frankie Negrón
Willie Nelson
Ne-Yo
Ljiljana Nikolovska
Frank Ocean
Finneas O'Connell
Angel Olsen
Amanda Palmer
Helen Park
Benj Pasek
Katy Perry
Pink
Mike Portnoy
Questlove
Kermit Quinn
Nathaniel Rateliff
Martha Reeves
Maggie Rogers
Linda Ronstadt
Dee Roscioli
Axl Rose
Charlie Rosen
Prince Royce
Merrilee Rush
Marvin Sapp
JP Saxe
Marc Shaiman
Shakira
Ryan Shaw
Alexis Spight
Bruce Springsteen
Paul Stanley
Tommy Stinson
Paul Stookey
Barbra Streisand
Harry Styles
Bruce Sudano
Taylor Swift
Olga Tañón
Shaina Taub
James Taylor
Kathy Taylor
Courtney Taylor-Taylor
Tony Terry
Charlie Thomas
Rob Thomas
Justin Timberlake
Dennis Tufano
Molly Tuttle
Andres Useche
Steven Van Zandt
Matthew Vasquez
Kurt Vile
Jessica Vosk
Rufus Wainwright
Hezekiah Walker
Reggie Watts
Diane Warren
Abigail Washburn
Bob Weir
Pete Wentz
Susan Werner
Dar Williams
Pharrell Williams
Juan Winans
Stevie Wonder
Chely Wright
Jesse Colin Young
Neil Young
Yungblud
Rachel Zegler

Sports figures

Baseball 
Rocco Baldelli (current manager of the Minnesota Twins)
Alex Cora (manager and former player for the Boston Red Sox)
Adrián González (former first baseman, announcer for Fox Deportes Baseball)
Jim Pohlad (owner of the Minnesota Twins)
Kenny Lofton
Alex Rodriguez

Basketball 
Ray Allen
Harrison Barnes (Sacramento Kings)
Matt Barnes
Sue Bird (Seattle Storm)
Chris Bosh
Rex Chapman
Natasha Cloud (Washington Mystics)
Jason Collins
Stephen Curry (Golden State Warriors)
Elena Delle Donne (Washington Mystics)
Joel Embiid (Philadelphia 76ers)
Julius Erving
Tobias Harris (Philadelphia 76ers)
Udonis Haslem (Miami Heat)
LeBron James (Los Angeles Lakers)
Magic Johnson (former player and president of operations for the Los Angeles Lakers)
Steve Kerr, (head coach of the Golden State Warriors)
Kara Lawson (head coach of the Duke Blue Devils women's basketball)
CJ McCollum (Portland Trail Blazers)
Donovan Mitchell (Utah Jazz)
Shaquille O'Neal (former player, sports analyst on Inside the NBA)
Chris Paul (Oklahoma City Thunder)
Gregg Popovich (head coach of the San Antonio Spurs)
Josh Richardson (Philadelphia 76ers)
Doc Rivers (head coach of the Philadelphia 76ers)
Ben Simmons
J. R. Smith (Los Angeles Lakers)
Karl-Anthony Towns (Minnesota Timberwolves)
Stan Van Gundy, (head coach of the New Orleans Pelicans)
Dwyane Wade

Hockey
JT Brown (Tampa Bay Lightning)
Jacob Trouba (New York Rangers)
Blake Wheeler (Winnipeg Jets)

Chess 
Garry Kasparov (former World Chess Champion)
Hikaru Nakamura

Football 
Nnamdi Asomugha
Marc Badain (president of the Las Vegas Raiders)
Bradley Chubb (Denver Broncos)
Tommie Harris
Calvin Johnson
Mike Holmgren, (former head coach of the Green Bay Packers and the Seattle Seahawks)
Brandon Lloyd
Bobby Massie
Bill O'Brien
Quinton Porter
Sage Rosenfels
Ryan Shazier
DeMaurice Smith (executive director of the National Football League Players Association)
Joe Tate
Steve Wagner

Poker 
Tony Dunst
Tom Dwan
Prahlad Friedman
Matthew Glantz
Daniel Negreanu
Doug Polk
Erik Seidel
Scott Seiver
Vanessa Selbst

Soccer 
DaMarcus Beasley (U.S. men's national soccer team)
Crystal Dunn (Portland Thorns FC and the U.S. women's national soccer team)
Mia Hamm (U.S. women's national soccer team)
Ashlyn Harris (Orlando Pride)
Stuart Holden (U.S. men's national soccer team)
Ali Krieger (Orlando Pride)
Alex Morgan (Tottenham Hotspur F.C. Women and the U.S. women's national soccer team)
Megan Rapinoe (OL Reign and the U.S. women's national soccer team)
Robbie Rogers
Abby Wambach (U.S. women's national soccer team)

Summer sports 
Virginia Gilder (former rower)
Greg Louganis (former diver)

Tennis 
Gigi Fernández
Billie Jean King (former World number 1 ranked female tennis players)
Ilana Kloss (player, coach, and commissioner of World TeamTennis)
Martina Navratilova

Winter sports 
Gretchen Bleiler (former professional halfpipe snowboarder)
David S. Blitzer (co-managing partner and minority owner of the New Jersey Devils)
Phill Drobnick (Director of Coaching for USA Curling)
Caroline Gleich (skier and mountaineer)
Michelle Kwan (figure skater)
Adam Rippon (figure skater)

Wrestling 
Mick Foley
Kevin Nash
Dwayne Johnson

Other 
Carey Hart (off-road truck racer) (Republican)
Michael Smith (former ESPN anchor)

See also 
 Endorsements in the 2020 Democratic Party presidential primaries
 News media endorsements in the 2020 United States presidential primaries
 News media endorsements in the 2020 United States presidential election
 List of Donald Trump 2020 presidential campaign endorsements
 List of former Trump administration officials who endorsed Joe Biden
 List of Jo Jorgensen 2020 presidential campaign endorsements
 List of Howie Hawkins 2020 presidential campaign endorsements
 List of Republicans who opposed the Donald Trump 2020 presidential campaign

Notes

References

External links 

Lists of 21st-century people
Lists of celebrities